Ebenezer Oluwafemi Ajilore (born 18 January 1985), also known as Femi, is a Nigerian former professional footballer who played as a midfielder.

He also holds a Ghanaian passport.

Femi has often played the role as central defensive midfielder in his clubs.

He played with the Nigerian U-23 national team in the 2008 Beijing and won the silver medal. He made his debut for the Super Eagles against Colombia on 19 November 2008. He was one time the most expensive player in Dutch side FC Groningen's history when they signed him before the 2008 Olympics. He had two spells at FC Midtjylland in the Danish Superliga before playing at Danish 2nd Division side Middelfart G&BK in the 2015–16 season. He retired from football in the summer of 2017 after failing to overcome his injuries.

References

External links 
Career statistics at Danmarks Radio
Ajilore wants Euro Cup action – The Sun News Online

1985 births
Living people
Sportspeople from Lagos
Association football midfielders
Nigerian footballers
Nigeria international footballers
Olympic medalists in football
Medalists at the 2008 Summer Olympics
Footballers at the 2008 Summer Olympics
Olympic footballers of Nigeria
Olympic silver medalists for Nigeria
F.C. Ebedei players
FC Midtjylland players
FC Groningen players
Brøndby IF players
Danish Superliga players
Eredivisie players
Nigerian expatriate footballers
Nigerian expatriate sportspeople in Denmark
Expatriate men's footballers in Denmark
Nigerian expatriate sportspeople in the Netherlands
Expatriate footballers in the Netherlands
Yoruba sportspeople
Nigerian people of Ghanaian descent
Middelfart Boldklub players
21st-century Nigerian people